Mederic was an Alemannic petty king. His brother Chnodomarius was the petty king of another district. Mederic spent much time in Gaul, where he was introduced to ancient Greek culture. Because of this influence, Mederic gave his son Agenaric the name Serapio, after the Graeco-Egyptian god Serapis.

References 
Dieter Geuenich: Geschichte der Alemannen (Kohlhammer-Urban-Taschenbücher. 575). 2., überarbeitete Auflage. Kohlhammer Verlag, Stuttgart 2005, . pp. 42-45

4th-century Germanic people
Alemannic rulers